Kanchana Gunawardene (born 9 October 1984) is a Sri Lankan first-class cricketer who played for Colts Cricket Club. He made his Twenty20 debut on 17 August 2004, for Nondescripts Cricket Club in the 2004 SLC Twenty20 Tournament.

See also
 List of Chilaw Marians Cricket Club players

References

External links
 

1984 births
Living people
Sri Lankan cricketers
Chilaw Marians Cricket Club cricketers
Colts Cricket Club cricketers
Nondescripts Cricket Club cricketers
Cricketers from Colombo